Yankee Doodle Dandy is a 1942 American biographical musical film about George M. Cohan, known as "The Man Who Owned Broadway". It stars James Cagney, Joan Leslie, Walter Huston, and Richard Whorf, and features Irene Manning, George Tobias, Rosemary DeCamp, Jeanne Cagney, and Vera Lewis. Joan Leslie's singing voice was partially dubbed by Sally Sweetland.

The film was written by Robert Buckner and Edmund Joseph, and directed by Michael Curtiz.  According to the special edition DVD, significant and uncredited improvements were made to the script by the twin brothers Julius J. Epstein and Philip G. Epstein. The film was a major hit for Warner Brothers, and was nominated for eight Academy Awards, including Best Picture, winning three.

In 1993, Yankee Doodle Dandy  was selected for preservation in the United States National Film Registry by the Library of Congress as being "culturally, historically, or aesthetically significant", and in 1998, the film was included on the American Film Institute's 100 Years...100 Movies list, a compilation of the 100 greatest films in American cinema.

Plot
In the early days of World War II, Cohan comes out of retirement to star as President Roosevelt in the Rodgers and Hart musical I'd Rather Be Right. On the first night, he is summoned to meet the president at the White House, who presents him with a Congressional Gold Medal (though the Cohan character on screen incorrectly identifies the award as the Congressional Medal of Honor). Cohan is overcome and chats with Roosevelt, recalling his early days on the stage. The film flashes back to his supposed birth on July 4, whilst his father is performing on the vaudeville stage.

Cohan and his sister join the family act as soon as they learn to dance, and soon The Four Cohans are performing successfully. But George gets too cocky as he grows up and is blacklisted by theatrical producers for being troublesome. He leaves the act and hawks his songs unsuccessfully to producers. In partnership with Sam Harris, another struggling writer, he finally interests a producer and they are on the road to success. He also marries Mary, a young singer/dancer.

As his star ascends, he persuades his now struggling parents to join his act, eventually vesting some of his valuable theatrical properties in their name.

Cohan retires, but returns to the stage several times, culminating in the role of the U.S. president. As he leaves the White House, after receiving the Congressional Gold Medal from the president, he descends a set of stairs while performing a tap dance (which Cagney thought up before the scene was filmed and undertook without rehearsal). Outside, he joins a military parade, where the soldiers are singing "Over There", and, at first, he isn't singing. Not knowing that Cohan is the song's composer, one of them asks if he knows the words. Cohan's response is a smile before joining in.

Cast

 James Cagney as George M. Cohan
 Joan Leslie as Mary Cohan
 Walter Huston as Jerry Cohan
 Richard Whorf as Sam Harris
 Irene Manning as Fay Templeton
 George Tobias as Dietz
 Rosemary DeCamp as Nellie Cohan
 Jeanne Cagney as Josie Cohan
 Eddie Foy, Jr. as  Eddie Foy, Sr.
 Frances Langford as Nora Bayes
 George Barbier as Erlanger
 S. Z. Sakall as Schwab
 Walter Catlett as Theatre Manager
 Minor Watson as Ed Albee
 Chester Clute as Harold Goff
 Odette Myrtil as Madame Bartholdi
 Douglas Croft as George M. Cohan (age 13)
 Patsy Lee Parsons as Josie Cohan (age 12)
 Captain Jack Young as President Franklin D. Roosevelt

Cast notes:
In his role as adviser to the film, George M. Cohan, who admired Fred Astaire's work, let it be known that he preferred Astaire, who also bore a passing resemblance to him, to star in his life story. Warners offered the role to Astaire first, but he turned it down because Cohan's eccentric, stiff-legged dancing was far removed from Astaire's own, more fluid, style.
James Cagney reprised the role of George M. Cohan in the movie The Seven Little Foys (1955), but only on the condition that he receive no money: He did the film as a tribute to Eddie Foy.  In Yankee Doodle Dandy, Eddie Foy, Jr. played the role of his own father.  In The Seven Little Foys, Bob Hope portrayed Foy; Charley Foy (brother of Eddie Foy, Jr.) served as a narrator.
Actress Jeanne Cagney, who played the part of Cohan's sister, was James Cagney's real-life sister. Cagney's brother, William Cagney, was the Associate Producer of the film.
Rosemary DeCamp, who played the mother of George M. Cohan, was, in fact, 11 years younger than Cagney.
President Franklin D. Roosevelt was played by Captain Jack Young, a lookalike who is seen only from the back. An impressionist, Art Gilmore, provided the voice of Roosevelt, uncredited. Gilmore would narrate the Joe McDoakes film shorts produced by Warners, and became a well-known announcer on television through the 1970s.
 Uncredited cast members include Eddie Acuff, Murray Alper, Ward Bond, Walter Brooke, Georgia Carroll, Glen Cavender, Spencer Charters, Wallis Clark, William B. Davidson, Ann Doran, Tom Dugan, Bill Edwards, Frank Faylen, Pat Flaherty, James Flavin, William Forrest, William Gillespie, Joe Gray, Creighton Hale, John Hamilton, Harry Hayden, Stuart Holmes, William Hopper, Eddie Kane, Fred Kelsey, Vera Lewis, Audrey Long, Hank Mann, Frank Mayo, Lon McCallister, Edward McWade, George Meeker, Dolores Moran, Charles Morton, Jack Mower, Paul Panzer, Francis Pierlot, Clinton Rosemond, Syd Saylor, Frank Sully, Dick Wessel, Leo White, Mickey Daniels and Dave Willock.

Background and production
Cagney, like Cohan, was an Irish-American who had been a song-and-dance man early in his career. His unique and seemingly odd presentation style, of half-singing and half-reciting the songs, reflected the style that Cohan himself used.  His natural dance style and physique were also a good match for Cohan. Newspapers at the time reported that Cagney intended to consciously imitate Cohan's song-and-dance style, but to play the normal part of the acting in his own style. Although director Curtiz was known as a taskmaster, he also gave his actors some latitude. Cagney and other players came up with a number of "bits of business", as Cagney called them, meaning improvised lines or action in theater parlance.

A number of the biographical particulars of the movie are Hollywood-ized fiction, such as omitting the fact that Cohan divorced and remarried, combining Cohan's two wives, Ethel and Agnes, into a single character named Mary, and taking some liberties with the chronology of Cohan's life and the order of his parents' deaths. In one scene, after Cohan suffers a flop with an atypical non-musical drama, Popularity, he composes a telegram apologizing to the public. He then walks out of the Western Union office to find newspaper sellers announcing the torpedoing of the Lusitania. In reality, the failed play was staged in 1906, and the Lusitania's sinking occurred in 1915.

Nevertheless, care was taken to make the sets, costumes, and dance steps match the original stage presentations. Twice, Cagney sprained an ankle while mastering Cohan's stiff-legged dance style. This effort was aided significantly by a former associate of Cohan's, Jack Boyle, who knew the original productions well. Boyle also appeared in the film in some of the dancing groups.

Cagney, as Cohan, is shown performing as a singing and dancing version of President Franklin D. Roosevelt. Although it was well known, the reality of Roosevelt's use of a wheelchair after polio was not emphasized at the time. In the film, Roosevelt never leaves his chair when meeting Cohan.

Cohan himself served as a consultant during the production of the film, as well as being credited with the incidental score. Due to his failing health, his actual involvement in the film was limited. But when completed, the film was privately screened for Cohan and he commented on Cagney's performance: "My God, what an act to follow!"

Because of Cohan's failing health, Warner Brothers moved up the scheduled gala premiere from July 4 to May 29; the original date had been chosen because of the film's patriotic theme and because in the movie, Cohan is said to have been born on the Fourth of July, as he wrote in the lyrics of his song, "Yankee Doodle Dandy." (However, Cohan was actually born on July 3.)  In the end, Cohan lived for several more months after the film's release.

The movie poster for this film was the first ever produced by noted poster designer Bill Gold.

Musical numbers
 "Overture" – Played by Orchestra behind titles.
 "Keep Your Eyes Upon Me (The Dancing Master)" – Sung and Danced by Walter Huston, then Sung and Danced by Henry Blair.
 "While Strolling Through the Park One Day" – Sung and Danced by Jo Ann Marlowe.
 "At a Georgia Camp Meeting" – Danced by James Cagney, Walter Huston, Rosemary DeCamp and Jeanne Cagney.
 "I Was Born in Virginia" – Sung and Danced by James Cagney, Jeanne Cagney, Walter Huston and Rosemary DeCamp.
 "The Warmest Baby in the Bunch" – Sung and Danced by Joan Leslie (dubbed by Sally Sweetland).
 "Harrigan" – Sung and Danced by James Cagney and Joan Leslie.
 "The Yankee Doodle Boy" – Sung and Danced by James Cagney, Joan Leslie (dubbed by Sally Sweetland) and Chorus.
 "Give My Regards To Broadway" – Sung and Danced by James Cagney and Chorus.
 "Oh You Wonderful Girl / Blue Skies, Gray Skies / The Belle of the Barbers' Ball" – Sung by James Cagney, Jeanne Cagney, Walter Huston and Rosemary DeCamp.
 "Mary's a Grand Old Name" – Sung by Joan Leslie (dubbed by Sally Sweetland).
 "Forty-Five Minutes from Broadway" – Sung by James Cagney.
 "Mary's a Grand Old Name" (reprise 1) – Sung by Joan Leslie (dubbed by Sally Sweetland).
 "Mary's a Grand Old Name" (reprise 2) – Sung by Irene Manning.
 "Forty-Five Minutes from Broadway" (reprise) – Sung by Chorus.
 "So Long, Mary" – Sung by Irene Manning and Chorus.
 "You're a Grand Old Flag" – Performed by James Cagney and Chorus.
 "Like the Wandering Minstrel" – Sung by James Cagney and Chorus.
 "Over There" – Sung by Frances Langford, James Cagney and Chorus.
 "A George M. Cohan Potpouri" – Sung by Frances Langford.
 "Off the Record" – Performed by James Cagney.
 "Over There" (reprise) – Sung by James Cagney and Chorus.
 "The Yankee Doodle Boy" (reprise) – Played by Orchestra behind end credits.

Production
Cagney had initially been opposed to a biopic of George M. Cohan's life, having disliked Cohan since the Actors' Equity Strike in 1919, in which he sided with the producers. In 1940, Cagney was named, along with 15 other Hollywood figures, in the grand jury testimony of John R. Leech, the self-described 'chief functionary' of the Los Angeles Communist Party who had been subpoenaed by the House Committee on Un-American Activities. The New York Times printed the allegation that Cagney was a communist on its front page. Cagney refuted the accusation and Martin Dies, Jr. made a statement to the press clearing Cagney. William Cagney, one of the film's producers, is reported to have said to his brother that "we're going to have to make the goddamndest patriotic picture that's ever been made. I think it's the Cohan story".

Reception

Box office
The film nearly doubled the earnings of Captains of the Clouds (1942), Cagney's previous effort, bringing in more than $6 million in rentals to Warner Bros.

According to Warner Bros records the film earned $4,631,000 domestically and $1,892,000 foreign.

This made it the biggest box-office success in the company's history up to that time. The star earned his contractual $150,000 salary and nearly half a million dollars in profit sharing. According to Variety, the film earned $4.8 million in theatrical rentals through its North American release.

Critical response
Contemporary reviews were highly positive. Bosley Crowther of The New York Times said that film patrons would do well to see it, for "you will find as warm and delightful a musical picture as has hit the screen in years, a corking good entertainment and as affectionate, if not as accurate, a film biography as has ever—yes, ever—been made ... there is so much in this picture and so many persons that deserve their meed of praise that every one connected with it can stick a feather in his hat and take our word—it's dandy!" Variety called the film "as entertaining as any top filmusical ever made ... James Cagney does a Cohan of which the original George M. might well be proud." Harrison's Reports wrote: "Excellent! Audiences should find this musical comedy, which is based on the life of George M. Cohan, one of the most sparkling and delightful musical pictures that have ever been brought to the screen. Much of its entertainment value is due to the exceptionally fine performance of James Cagney, whose impersonation of Mr. Cohan is uncanny—his gestures, his talk, and his dancing, are done to perfection." John Mosher of The New Yorker called the film "a complete delight, an extravaganza of tunes the country has liked for decades," although he considered it "dubious" as a biography of Cohan.

Review aggregator website Rotten Tomatoes reports that 90% of 29 critics' reviews are positive, with an average rating of 7.9/10. The site's critics consensus reads: "James Cagney deploys his musical gifts to galvanizing effect in Yankee Doodle Dandy, a celebration of patriotic fervor as much as it is a biopic of George M. Cohan." On Metacritic, the film has a weighted average score of 89 out of 100, based on 10 critics, indicating "universal acclaim".

Awards and honors
The film won Academy Awards for Best Actor in a Leading Role (James Cagney), Best Music, Scoring of a Musical Picture (Ray Heindorf and Heinz Roemheld), and Best Sound Recording (Nathan Levinson). It was nominated for Best Actor in a Supporting Role (Walter Huston), Best Director, Best Film Editing for George Amy, Best Picture and Best Writing, Original Story. In 1993, Yankee Doodle Dandy  was selected for preservation in the United States National Film Registry by the Library of Congress as being "culturally, historically, or aesthetically significant".

American Film Institute recognition
 1998: AFI's 100 Years...100 Movies – #100
 2004: AFI's 100 Years...100 Songs – #71
 The Yankee Doodle Boy
 2005: AFI's 100 Years...100 Movie Quotes:
 "My mother thanks you. My father thanks you. My sister thanks you. And I thank you." – #97
 2006: AFI's 100 Years of Musicals – #18
 2006: AFI's 100 Years...100 Cheers – #88
 2007: AFI's 100 Years...100 Movies (10th Anniversary Edition) – #98

See also 
 Yankee Doodle Daffy, a 1943 animated short film starting Daffy Duck and Porky Pig.

Adaptations
 Yankee Doodle Dandy was adapted as a radio play on the October 19, 1942 broadcast of The Screen Guild Theater, starring James Cagney with Rita Hayworth and Betty Grable.
 George M! is a stage musical, also based on the life of George M. Cohan, opening on Broadway in 1968.

References

External links

 
 
 
 
 

1942 films
1940s musical drama films
1940s biographical drama films
American musical drama films
American biographical drama films
American black-and-white films
Biographical films about entertainers
Biographical films about musicians
Cultural depictions of classical musicians
Cultural depictions of Franklin D. Roosevelt
Cultural depictions of Theodore Roosevelt
Films about musical theatre
Films directed by Michael Curtiz
Films featuring a Best Actor Academy Award-winning performance
Films produced by Hal B. Wallis
Films scored by Heinz Roemheld
Films scored by Ray Heindorf
Films set in Washington, D.C.
Films that won the Best Sound Mixing Academy Award
Films that won the Best Original Score Academy Award
Independence Day (United States) films
Jukebox musical films
George M. Cohan
Musical films based on actual events
Films with screenplays by Julius J. Epstein
Films with screenplays by Philip G. Epstein
United States National Film Registry films
1942 drama films
Warner Bros. films
1940s English-language films
1940s American films